Jequiá River may refer to:

 Jequiá River (Alagoas), a river in the state of Alqagoas, Brazil
 Jequiá River (Rio de Janeiro), a river in the state of Rio de Janeiro, Brazil